Cayo West is an electoral constituency in the Cayo District represented in the House of Representatives of the National Assembly of Belize since 2020 by Jorge Espat of the People's United Party (PUP).

Profile

The Cayo West constituency was one of 10 new seats created for the 1984 general election. Cayo West consists of an area in west-central Cayo District abutting the Guatemalan border. The border town of Benque Viejo del Carmen is the constituency's main settlement.

Area Representatives

Elections

References

Belizean House constituencies established in 1984
Political divisions in Belize
Cayo West